The Gastromyzontidae are a family of loaches native to China and Southeast Asia, where typically found in streams and rivers with a fast current.  The family includes about 137 species in eighteen genera. This family was resurrected by M. Kottelat in his review and revision of the loaches in 2012. They are commonly called hillstream loaches (a name shared with balitoridae).

References